Vooremaa Landscape Conservation Area is a nature reserve situated in Tartu County, Estonia.

Its area is 9882 ha.

The protected area was designated in 2006 to protect the nature of Vooremaa.

References

Nature reserves in Estonia
Geography of Tartu County